Lǐ Kàn (Li K'an, traditional: 李衎, simplified: 李衎; c. 1245 – 1320) was a Chinese painter during the Yuan Dynasty (1271–1368).

Li was born in Jiqiu county (present-day Beijing). His style name was 'Zhong Bin' and his sobriquet was 'Xi Zhai'. Li lived for some time in a bamboo valley, which inspired many of his works. His ink bamboo executed refined strokes which were commented on their realism, followed the style of Wen Tong.

References

External links
Sung and Yuan paintings, an exhibition catalog from The Metropolitan Museum of Art Libraries (fully available online as PDF), which contains material on Li Kan (see list of paintings)

1245 births
1320 deaths
Painters from Beijing
Yuan dynasty painters